Shchepkin or Schepkin (from щепка meaning small peace of wood, splinter) is a Russian masculine surname, its feminine counterpart is Shchepkina or Schepkina. It may refer to
Mikhail Shchepkin (1788–1863), Russian actor
Sergey Schepkin (born 1962), American pianist of Russian origin
Tatiana Shchepkina-Kupernik (1874–1952), Russian writer, dramatist, poet and translator, granddaughter of Mikhail

Russian-language surnames